The 1971 World Judo Championships were the 7th edition of the Men's World Judo Championships, and were held at the Friedrich-Ebert-Halle in Ludwigshafen, West Germany from 2–4 September, 1971.

Medal overview

Men

Medal table

References 

World Championships
J
World Judo Championships
J
Sport in Ludwigshafen
20th century in Ludwigshafen